The NYU Violets football program was a college football team that represented New York University.  The team was independent of any conference but was a part of the National Collegiate Athletic Association.  The team had 24 head coaches during its time of operations and had its first recorded football game in 1894.  The final coach was Hugh Devore who first took the position for the 1950 season and concluded with the end of the 1952 season.

Key

Coaches

Notes

References

NYU Violets

Violets
Lists of sportspeople from New York (state)
NYU Violets head football coaches